Retiro is the name of a railway station complex in Buenos Aires, Argentina, that includes three main terminal train stations (Retiro-Mitre, Retiro-Belgrano and Retiro-San Martín) and two terminal subway stations (Retiro of Line C and Retiro of Line E).

The complex is named after the neighborhood where it is located, Retiro. It is close to Retiro Bus Terminal Station, the country´s biggest bus terminal.

Overview
The stations are very close to the Retiro bus station (Terminal de Omnibus), the principal long-distance bus terminal in Buenos Aires. The complex is also accessible by the C line of the Buenos Aires Metro system and by numerous local public bus services. The stations will also be accessible by both Line E and Line H of the metro once their extensions are complete.

Three stations are located opposite Plaza San Martín, a large park.

Services

Commuter rail

Retiro is the largest railway complex in Buenos Aires and more commuter trains arrive and depart from here than in any other station in the city. As of 2015, the following companies operate regular services to the suburbs of Buenos Aires along three principal lines:

 Mitre service calling at José León Suárez (General San Martín Partido), Tigre, and Bartolomé Mitre along its three branches. Long-distance services to Rosario and Tucumán cities. Both operated by Trenes Argentinos.
 Belgrano Norte service to Villa Rosa (Pilar Partido). Operated by private company Ferrovías.
 San Martín service calling at Villa Devoto, El Palomar, Caseros and Pilar, amongst others. Operated by Trenes Argentinos.

Long-distance

In addition to its status as the hub of an extensive commuter railway network, Retiro stations are also the terminus of a few long-distance passenger services which provide access to cities in the north and west of the country. As of 2015, state-owned Trenes Argentinos manages long-distance services to the cities of Córdoba, Tucumán and Rosario. Those services had been run by defunct company Ferrocentral.

From the Retiro San Martín station trains depart to Rufino station in Santa Fe Province.

Gallery

See also

Retiro Belgrano railway station
Retiro Mitre railway station
Retiro San Martín railway station
Rail transport in Argentina
Retiro (Line C Buenos Aires Underground)
Retiro (Line E Buenos Aires Underground)
Retiro (Line G Buenos Aires Underground)
Retiro (Line H Buenos Aires Underground)

References

External links

Railway stations in Buenos Aires
Railway stations opened in 1915